Cedric Mingiedi (born 5 December 1994) is a Belgian footballer who currently plays for KFC Gerda Sint-Niklaas.

External links

1994 births
Living people
Belgian footballers
Association football defenders
K.S.C. Lokeren Oost-Vlaanderen players
K.V. Mechelen players
Belgian Pro League players
Sportspeople from Sint-Niklaas
Footballers from East Flanders